Jarid Manos is an author, speaker, environmental activist and founder and president of the Great Plains Restoration Council.  He is author of Ghetto Plainsman (2007, 2010).

He has been described as "an ex-drug dealing gay black person of Moorish descent who is currently an environmental activist."

According to an article and interview with Manos in 2008, as a child in Ohio he "dreamed about buffalo, prairie dogs, and the Great Plains," (and then) "even while he dealt drugs on the New York City streets", and was eventually inspired by the idea of a Buffalo Commons. 

An environmental advocate for more than fifteen years, Manos has been published in or has been written about in numerous magazines and newspapers.

in 1999, Manos founded the Great Plains Restoration Council and also was a founding member of the Southern Plains Land Trust.  The Southern Plains Land Trust, based in Boulder, Colorado had purchased for $198,000 a  property for receiving relocated prairie dogs, and was involved in controversy with Baca County, Colorado landowners.  the controversy rose to consideration by the House Agriculture Committee of the U.S. House of Representatives.

In 1997, Manos, living in Pueblo, was convicted of hunter harassment while acquitted of criminal trespass, in a civil disobedience lawsuit.  Manos and six other protestors had been arrested on July 5 "for disrupting a prairie dog shoot on private property".

His book Ghetto Plainsman was warmly endorsed by bestselling author E. Lynn Harris (1955-1999) before Harris died.

Published works
Ghetto Plainsman (2007,2010)

References

External links
Ghetto Plainsman, Jarid Manos

Year of birth missing (living people)
Living people
American environmentalists